Andrea T. Norris is an American information technology executive and civil servant. She is the chief information officer of the National Institutes of Health and director of its Center for Information Technology. Norris is a fellow of the National Academy of Public Administration.

Life 
Norris completed a B.A. in economics from College of William & Mary. She earned a M.B.A. with a major in information systems management from the George Washington University.

Norris was a management consultant at Booz Allen Hamilton and served on the Private Sector Commission on Cost Control. She joined NASA, working as the deputy chief information officer for management. Norris later worked for the National Science Foundation where she was responsible for establishing​ the agency's strategy, policies, and programs and managing its information technology systems and services.

She joined the senior executive service in 2001 and received the Presidential Meritorious Service Award in 2008 and 2019. In 2011, Norris joined the National Institutes of Health (NIH) as the chief information officer and serves as director of the Center for Information Technology. In 2020, Norris was inducted as a fellow of the National Academy of Public Administration. She retires from the NIH on December 31, 2022.

References

Citations

Bibliography 

Living people
Chief information officers
National Institutes of Health people
College of William & Mary alumni
George Washington University alumni
United States National Science Foundation officials
Booz Allen Hamilton people
NASA people
21st-century American businesswomen
21st-century American businesspeople
Fellows of the United States National Academy of Public Administration
Year of birth missing (living people)